"Lonely Teenager" is a song written by Alfred DiPaola, Silvio Faraci, and Salvatore Pippa and performed by Dion.  It is Dion's first solo single.  The song reached number 12 on the Billboard Hot 100 and number 47 in the UK in 1960.  It was featured on his 1961 album, Alone with Dion.

The song was arranged by Bob Mersey.

References

1960 songs
1960 singles
Dion DiMucci songs
Laurie Records singles